Ixora margaretae is a species of plant in the family Rubiaceae. It is endemic to New Caledonia.  It is threatened by habitat loss.

References

Endemic flora of New Caledonia
Critically endangered plants
Taxonomy articles created by Polbot
Taxa named by Birgitta Bremer